Nyasha Mushekwi (born 21 August 1987) is a Zimbabwean professional footballer who plays for Chinese Super League club Zhejiang.

Career
Born in Harare, Mushekwi started out playing for CAPS United in his homeland Zimbabwe. He won the top scorer award after scoring 21 league goals for the Harare giants in 2009 season. In 2010, he made the move to South African club Mamelodi Sundowns where he found immediate success when he became the second best goalscorer of the 2010–11 Premier Soccer League season. In April 2013, as his contract was nearing its end, Mamelodi Sundowns extended the deal with another year plus an option for an additional second year.

For the 2013–14 season, Mushekwi was sent on loan to Belgian club K.V. Oostende, but in February 2014 he suffered an injury from which he did not recover until November. Since his South African club had already used all its foreign player slots for the season, he could not be registered to play for them once he had recovered from injury. In an effort to find a new club in 2015, Mushekwi went on trial with Hobro IK in Denmark. However, he signed with Swedish club Djurgårdens IF, which contacted him while he was in Denmark and brought him to Sweden for a trial, resulting in a 6-month loan deal.

China 
On 22 December 2015, Mushekwi transferred to China League One side Dalian Yifang. He was the top goal scorer in the team for 3 consecutive seasons. However, he suffered a few serious injuries later, from which his physical condition was affected.

In the 2017 season, he was once tackled brutally in the right leg, but volunteered to stay on the pitch, and scored an important goal. He eventually helped Yifang win the League One title. In 2018, he was not the preferred player at first competing with Nicolás Gaitán and Yannick Carrasco, but he won a position by continuous goals. He had pelvis injuries during the season. Again he tried to stay in the game after a heavy collision in the head with opponent goalkeeper. Overall, his strong spirit gained high reputation among local fans, and was regarded as one of the most important players in team history.

In the 2019 season, his performance was below expectation after the surgery. On 15 July 2019, Mushekwi joined China League One side Zhejiang Greentown. He would play a vital part as the club gained promotion to the top tier at the end of the 2021 campaign.

International career
Mushekwi is a member of the Zimbabwe national football team. He was involved in the Asiagate scandal but avoided a lifetime ban from international football after volunteering information in the investigation.

Personal life
Mushekwi attended Churchill School where his main sport was basketball. He was voted the most valuable player of the Mashonaland Basketball Association League and represented Zimbabwe at under-19 and senior national team level in the sport.

Career statistics

International
. Scores and results list Zimbabwe's goal tally first.

Honours

Club
Dalian Yifang
China League One: 2017

References

External links
 
 

1987 births
Living people
Alumni of Churchill School (Harare)
Zimbabwean footballers
Association football forwards
Sportspeople from Harare
Mamelodi Sundowns F.C. players
CAPS United players
K.V. Oostende players
Djurgårdens IF Fotboll players
Dalian Professional F.C. players
Zhejiang Professional F.C. players
South African Premier Division players
Belgian Pro League players
Allsvenskan players
Chinese Super League players
China League One players
Expatriate soccer players in South Africa
Expatriate footballers in Belgium
Expatriate footballers in Sweden
Expatriate footballers in China
2017 Africa Cup of Nations players
2019 Africa Cup of Nations players
Zimbabwe international footballers